Athyrtis is a butterfly genus of the Ithomiini tribe in the brush-footed butterfly family, Nymphalidae. It is a monotypic genus, containing only Athyrtis mechanitis. The genus and the species were named by father and son entomologists Cajetan and Rudolf Felder in 1862.

References 

Ithomiini
Nymphalidae of South America
Nymphalidae genera
Taxa named by Baron Cajetan von Felder
Taxa named by Rudolf Felder